Port Moresby International Airport , also known as Jacksons International Airport, is an international airport located  outside Port Moresby in Papua New Guinea. It is the largest and busiest airport in Papua New Guinea, with an estimated 1.4 million passengers using the airport in 2015, and is the main hub for Air Niugini, the national airline of Papua New Guinea. The airport serves as the main hub for PNG Air and Travel Air. It replaced the original Port Moresby airport, in what is now the suburb of Waigani, whose airstrip remained until the 1990s but no trace of which remains, having been built over.

Terminals
Jacksons International Airport consists of two terminals: the Domestic Terminal, housing Air Niugini and PNG Air, and the International Terminal, servicing all other international airlines including Air Niugini's and PNG Air's international routes. The International Terminal features four aircraft parking bays, four of which are equipped with aerobridges. The two terminals are linked by a covered walkway.

Airlines and destinations

Passenger

Cargo

Other facilities
Air Niugini has its head office in the Air Niugini House, near the airport property.

See also

 USAAF in the Southwest Pacific
 Kila Airfield (3 Mile Drome)
 Wards Airfield (5 Mile Drome)
 Berry Airfield (12 Mile Drome)
 Schwimmer Airfield (14 Mile Drome)
 Durand Airfield (17 Mile Drome)
 Rogers (Rarona) Airfield (30 Mile Drome)
 Fishermans (Daugo Island) Airfield

References

 Maurer, Maurer (1983). Air Force Combat Units of World War II. Maxwell AFB, Alabama: Office of Air Force History. .
 www.pacificwrecks.com
 A-Z World Airports: Jacksons International Airport

External links
 
 Official website

Airports in Papua New Guinea
Airfields of the United States Army Air Forces in Papua New Guinea
Buildings and structures in Port Moresby
Art Deco architecture